Prince Baltasar Carlos in the Riding School, is a painting by Diego Velázquez, painted at the Palacio del Buen Retiro outside Madrid, probably in 1636. There are two versions of the painting, one on loan to the National Gallery in London, the other in the Wallace Collection in the same city; the latter is sometimes attributed to the studio of Velázquez, sometimes to Velázquez himself.

History 

The original version of the work was loaned to the National Gallery in London in 2007–2008.

The first documented mention of the later version is in a letter written in 1828 from Madrid by the Scottish artist David Wilkie, who described it as a "duplicate" of the painting in the possession of Robert Grosvenor, 2nd Earl Grosvenor. In 1856 it was bought by Richard Seymour-Conway, 4th Marquess of Hertford, at a sale of the effects of the poet Samuel Rogers, and so passed into the Wallace Collection.

The paintings 

Both versions of the painting show the Infante Baltasar Carlos, at the age of about seven, on horseback in front of the Palacio del Buen Retiro outside Madrid; behind him is a dwarf. The horse is performing a levade, one of the "airs above the ground" of  the haute école of classical dressage.

Behind them, on a balcony of the palace, stand King Philip IV and Queen Isabel.

References 

Paintings by Diego Velázquez
1636 paintings
Equestrian portraits
Paintings in the Wallace Collection
Collections of the National Gallery, London